Orphanostigma abruptalis is a moth of the family Crambidae. The species was first described by Francis Walker in 1859. It occurs in the tropics of the Old World from Africa to Australia.

The adult's wingspan is approximately 15 to 20 mm.

Known food plants of this moth are several Lamiaceae, including species from the genera Ocimum, Mentha, Perilla, Hyptis and a Theaceae.

References

External links
 "Orphanostigma abruptalis (Walker, 1859)". Atlas of Living Australia

Spilomelinae
Moths of Cape Verde
Moths of Africa
Moths of Mauritius
Moths of Réunion
Moths of Seychelles
Moths described in 1859